The  is a limited express train service in Japan operated by Kyushu Railway Company (JR Kyushu), which runs between  and .

Rolling stock

Present
 KiHa 185 series DMU: 1992–Present

Past
 KiHa 58/65 DMU

History
From 5 March 1966, the train was upgraded to become an express service.

References

Named passenger trains of Japan
Railway services introduced in 1959